Jersey is a heavily fortified island with coastal fortifications that date to the English Civil War, the Napoleonic Wars, and Nazi Germany's occupation of the Channel Islands. The fortifications include castles, forts, towers, Martello towers, artillery batteries, and seawalls. Not infrequently, fortifications from one period are built on the site of earlier fortifications, or very near them, geography having remained the same even when firepower increased.

As of 2013, some of the fortifications are museums, or holiday accommodation, private homes, and event and sport venues. Most are under the control of the States of Jersey, Jersey Heritage, the National Trust for Jersey, and the Channel Islands Occupation Society.

Castles

Forts

Coastal towers (pre-World War II)

Coastal towers stand all along the coast of the island. The British built 22 round towers, one similar square tower, and eight Martello towers towards the end of the 18th century and in the early to mid-19th century, but now only 24 remain, including seven of the Martellos.

Conway's towers

On 28 May 1778 the governor of Jersey, Field Marshal Henry Seymour Conway, submitted plans to Lord Weymouth for the construction of 30 coastal towers to forestall, or at least impede French incursions on the island. King George III granted approval and funding on 5 July 1778.

Work began in 1779, after a failed French landing at St Ouen's Bay on 1 May 1779. Perhaps four had been completed by the time of the Battle of Jersey in 1781, in which however they played no part. Guernsey, which the French did not attack, had built 15 loophole towers between 1778 and 1779.

Seymour Tower, which replaced an earlier tower on the same spot at La Rocque, was built of granite and was the only square tower. The other 22 towers that Conway had constructed were round.

Although frequently called Martello towers, the round towers are taller, and they predate the development of true Martello towers. The round towers differ from Martello towers in several ways. The Jersey towers are mostly built with local granite rather than brick, have a slighter batter (taper), and most importantly, originally did not have a cannon on the top platform. (The Guernsey round towers have a strong batter on the ground floor and no machicolations; they too initially did not carry a gun on the top platform.) Later, at the onset of the Napoleonic Wars, both the Jersey and Guernsey towers each received a 12-pounder carronade on a pivot mount for the top platform.

During the German occupation of the Channel Islands during World War II, the Germans adapted some of the towers to their own purposes. The Germans also destroyed several towers.

Some of the surviving towers have been painted on the seaward side to serve as daymarks (navigational aids). Archirondel is painted red and white, while other towers are painted white and red, or white, in whole or in part, again, on the seaward side. The order below is counter-clockwise from the north-west corner of the island.

Numismatics
The latest Jersey pound note design (2010) has a picture of the St Clement's tower at Le Hocq. This tower also appears on the reverse of the Jersey 1p coin.

Martello towers

The British built eight true Martello towers in Jersey, three between 1808 and 1814, and five between 1834 and 1837. The German occupation forces destroyed one of the second group, L'Etacq,  during World War II.

Coastal batteries, magazines and guardhouses
La Tour Cârrée
Le Couperon guardhouse
Le Don Hilton
 Plémont guardhouse. The British built the guardhouse in the 18th century, and by 1812 it had a battery associated with it that was armed with an 18-pounder muzzle-loading gun. During the German occupation, the Germans made a "reinforced field position" of the guardhouse. They added an emplacement with twin machine guns, a mortar emplacement, an observation post, and a searchlight shelter with railroad tracks linking it to twin operating sites. They also added a "Tobruk" with a tank turret atop it.

World War II coastal fortifications

During World War II Nazi Germany constructed a considerable number of fortifications in the Channel Islands which form part of the Atlantic Wall. The Channel Islands were amongst the most heavily fortified parts of the Atlantic Wall, particularly Alderney which is the closest to France. In Jersey, the fortifications include Hohlgangsanlage tunnels and artillery batteries such as Battery Moltke and Battery Lothringen.

The most distinctive new structures the Germans built were the Marine Peilstand (MP) towers that they used to search for targets at sea. The Germans had intended to build nine towers, but only completed three. These towers are round and have five or more floors with observation embrasures, as well as defensive embrasures. MP1 is part of Battery Lothringen, MP2 overlooks Corbière lighthouse and is now known as the Radio Tower, and MP3 is part of Battery Moltke. The design of the towers inadvertently and somewhat ironically reflect the Bauhaus movement of Modernist architecture (1919-1933), a movement that the Nazis had tried to suppress.

As well as building many new fortifications, the German forces made their own additions to some of the existing fortifications. These additions include gun emplacements and various types of bunkers.

Organisation Todt built the fortifications using imported labour, primarily prisoners of war and workers deported from occupied countries. The Germans transported over 16,000 slave workers to the Channel Islands to build the fortifications.

See also
History of Jersey

Citations and references
Citations

References
Clements, William H. (1998) Towers of Strength: Martello Towers Worldwide. (London: Pen & Sword). .
Grimsley, E.J. (1988) The historical development of the Martello Tower in the Channel Islands. (Sarnian Publications).

External links

Buildings and structures in Jersey
Towers in Jersey
Fortifications in Jersey
Jersey
German occupation of Jersey during World War II